Ramkrishna More was an Indian politician. He was elected to the Lok Sabha, the lower house of the Parliament of India as a member of the Indian National Congress.

References

External links
Official biographical sketch in Parliament of India website

https://mpcnews.in/prof-ramakrishna-more-my-father-312477/

India MPs 1980–1984
India MPs 1984–1989
Lok Sabha members from Maharashtra
1947 births
2003 deaths